Buffalo station could refer to:

 Buffalo–Exchange Street station, a train station in Buffalo, New York, US
 Buffalo–Depew station, a train station in Depew, New York, US
 Buffalo Central Terminal, a historic former railroad station in Buffalo, New York, US
 Buffalo Grove station, a commuter station in Buffalo Grove, Illinois, US
 Buffalo railway station, a former railway station in South Gippsland, Victoria, Canada
 Lackawanna Terminal (Buffalo, New York), a former railroad station in Buffalo, New York, US
 Lehigh Valley Terminal, a demolished train station in Buffalo, New York, US
 New Buffalo station, a train station in New Buffalo, Michigan, US

See also 
 Buffalo AirStation, a series of wireless LAN equipment
 Buffalo, Rochester and Pittsburgh Railroad Station (disambiguation)